Socialist Party of the Oppressed (ESP; , PSB) is a Marxist-Leninist political party in the Republic of Turkey. It defines itself as "a militant revolutionary socialist party fighting for a workers'-labourers' federative republic in Turkey and Northern Kurdistan."

Development
Some sources, including the public officials, hold the view that ESP is a legal front for the banned ICOR affiliate Marxist–Leninist Communist Party. Among its founders is Figen Yüksekdağ, the former co-president of the Peoples' Democratic Party.

The party is one of the participants in the Peoples' Democratic Congress, a political initiative instrumental in founding the Peoples' Democratic Party in 2012.

Prosecution
In 2013 The Daily Telegraph called it "a small leftist group" after the homes of 90 ESP members were raided in connection with their involvement in the 2013 protests in Turkey. The Telegraph noted that "Police also searched the offices of the Atilim daily [Atılım] and the Etkin news agency, local media outlets linked to the ESP group, the NTV and CNN-Turk television stations reported."

2015 Bombing
The youth wing of the Socialist Party of the Oppressed, known as the Socialist Youth Associations Federation (SGDF), was the main target of the 2015 Suruç bombing. A group had travelled from Istanbul to Suruç on the Syrian border to assist in the reconstruction of the neighboring Syrian town of Kobanî after it was destroyed by warfare.

References

External links

2010 establishments in Turkey
Communist parties in Turkey
Far-left politics in Turkey
Hoxhaist parties
Anti-revisionist organizations
Peoples' Democratic Congress
Political parties established in 2010